Foli is both a surname and a given name. Notable people with the name include:

Signor Foli (1837–1899), 19th century Irish bass opera singer
Tim Foli (born 1950), American former professional baseball player
Foli Adade (born 1991), Ghanaian professional footballer

See also
Foley (disambiguation)
Foly